The 1987 Hi-Tec British Open Championships was held at the South Bank Squash Club with the later stages being held at the Wembley Conference Centre from 4–14 April 1987. Jahangir Khan won his sixth consecutive title defeating Jansher Khan in the final 9-6 9-0 9-5. Eight times champion Geoff Hunt made a comeback after a five-year absence.

Draw and results

Seeds

Final
 Jahangir Khan beat  Jansher Khan 9-6 9-0 9-5

Section 1

Section 2

References

Men's British Open Squash Championships
Men's British Open Championship
Men's British Open Squash Championship
Men's British Open Squash Championship
Men's British Open Squash Championship
Squash competitions in London